Union Township is one of twelve townships in Clark County, Indiana, United States. As of the 2010 census, its population was 3,507 and it contained 1,415 housing units.

History
Union Township was organized in 1858. Its name was given from the fact that this township was created through the merger or "union" of land given by three neighboring townships.

Geography

Cities and towns
 Memphis

Unincorporated towns
 Perry Crossing
 Slatecut
 Sylvan Grove
(This list is based on USGS data and may include former settlements.)

Adjacent townships
 Monroe Township (north)
 Charlestown Township (east)
 Silver Creek Township (south)
 Carr Township (southwest)

Major highways
  Interstate 65
  U.S. Route 31

Cemeteries
The township contains three cemeteries: Black and White (aka Weir or Wilson), Bowery, Ebenezer Methodist Episcopal Church.

References
 United States Census Bureau cartographic boundary files
 U.S. Board on Geographic Names

External links

 Indiana Township Association
 United Township Association of Indiana

Townships in Clark County, Indiana
Townships in Indiana
Populated places established in 1858
1858 establishments in Indiana